The men's 20 kilometres road run event at the 1990 World Junior Championships in Athletics was held in Plovdiv, Bulgaria, on 12 August.

Medalists

Results

Final
12 August

Participation
According to an unofficial count, 28 athletes from 20 countries participated in the event.

References

20 kilometres road run
Road running at the World Junior Championships in Athletics